The International Association of Innovation Professionals (IAOIP) is a professional association for innovation professionals with 4,000 members in more than 100 countries as of 2021. IAOIP is also a certifying body for innovation professionals.

US TAG for ISO TC 279
IAOIP collaborates with ANSI on the U.S. Technical Advisory Group (TAG) for ISO TC 279 the technical committee of the International Organization for Standardization purposed with developing, maintaining and promoting standards in the fields of innovation management and development of the ISO 56000 series of standards.

Journal

The International Journal of Innovation Science is published by IAOIP. The journal has published articles on topics such as user innovation, role of diversity in innovation, and design theory. The journal is indexed in Scopus and Web of Science.

See also
 Innovation
 Innovation Management
 ISO 56000
 ISO TC 279

References

External links
www.iaoip.org – IAOIP website for innovation professionals
IJIS - International Journal of Innovation Science

Professional associations based in the United States